The CMLL World Trios Championship (Campeonato Mundial Trios de CMLL in Spanish) is the primary professional wrestling three-man tag team championship promoted by the Mexican Lucha Libre wrestling promotion Consejo Mundial de Lucha Libre (CMLL; Spanish for "World Wrestling Council") since 1993. Before the CMLL World Trios Championship was created, the Mexican National Trios Championship was the primary Trios championship in CMLL; since 1993, the Mexican National title has been relegated to a secondary championship compared to the CMLL World Trios Championship. As it is a professional wrestling championship, it is not won legitimately; it is instead won via a scripted ending to a match or awarded to a wrestler because of a storyline. All title matches take place under two out of three falls rules.

The first champions to be recognized by CMLL were MS-1, Pirata Morgan and El Satánico (a team known as Los Infernales; Spanish for "The Infernals") who defeated the team of El Brazo, Brazo de Oro and Brazo de Plata (known collectively as Los Brazos; Spanish for "The Arms") in the finals of a 16-team tournament. Los Guerreros Laguneros (Euforia, Gran Guerrero and Último Guerrero) are the current champions, having defeated The Cl4n (Pronounced "the Clan"; Ciber the Main Man, The Chris and Sharlie Rockstar) to win the title on September 28, 2018. They are the 29th overall championship team and this is their first reign as a team. There have been 29 overall championship reigns; in total, 56 individuals have formed 27 championship teams. La Ola Amarilla ("The Yellow Wave"; Okumura, Hiroshi Tanahashi and Taichi) held the championship the shortest time, at 14 days. Black Warrior, Blue Panther and Dr. Wagner Jr. hold the record for the longest single reign of any team, but due to the uncertainty of when the championship was vacated it can only be verified that they held them for a minimum of 1,141 days. Dr. Wagner Jr.'s four reigns combine to 2,051 days, the highest of any wrestler. Los Infernales and the team of El Hijo del Fantasma, Héctor Garza and La Máscara (Collectively known as Los Ángeles Rebeldes; "The Rebel Angels") are the only two trios to have won the title twice; Héctor Garza also holds the record for most individual reigns, with five reigns as part of four teams. The championship has been vacated six times, either because one or more members of the team left the promotion or because a team split up; each time a tournament was held to determine the new champions.

Title history

Combined reigns

By team

By wrestler

Footnotes

References

General source for title changes before 2000

Specific

Consejo Mundial de Lucha Libre championships
Professional wrestling trios tag team champion lists